Saturday Morning is a slow bluesy jazz album by alto saxophonist Sonny Criss, recorded on March 1, 1975 for Xanadu Records.

Reception

AllMusic awarded the album 4½ stars with its review by Scott Yanow stating "Criss, an underrated altoist who was instantly recognizable within three notes, was neglected during long portions of his career but he did leave behind several memorable recordings, such as this one. Recommended."

Track listing
All compositions by Sonny Criss except as indicated
 "Angel Eyes" (Earl Brent, Matt Dennis) – 5:29
 "Tin Tin Deo" (Gil Fuller, Chano Pozo) – 6:44
 "Jeannie's Knees" – 5:08
 "Saturday Morning" – 5:01	
 "My Heart Stood Still" (Lorenz Hart, Richard Rodgers) – 6:46
 "Until the Real Thing Comes Along"  (Sammy Cahn, Saul Chaplin, L.E. Freeman) – 5:44
 "Confusion"  (Barry Harris) – 4:05

Personnel 
 Sonny Criss – alto saxophone
 Barry Harris – piano
 Leroy Vinnegar – bass
 Lenny McBrowne – drums

References

1975 albums
Xanadu Records albums
Sonny Criss albums